The Gower Branch Canal is a half-mile canal at Tividale in England, linking Albion Junction on the Birmingham Level (453 feet above sea) of the Birmingham Canal Navigations, and Brades Hall Junction (sometimes written Bradeshall Junction) on the BCN's older Wolverhampton (473 ft) level, via three locks, the Brades Locks, at the Southern, Brades Hall end.

It has a towpath on its eastern side and is crossed by only one road, the A457, just north of the middle lock. The branch is suitable for narrowboats of up to 70 foot length and 7 foot beam.

It facilitated travel between the Netherton Tunnel Branch Canal and the BCN Old Main Line, without the need for a long detour to Tipton or Smethwick and back.

History

The branch was authorised by the Birmingham Canal Act of 1768 but was not completed until 1836.

Features

Photographs

See also

Canals of the United Kingdom
History of the British canal system

References

Bibliography

External links

Jim Shead - Gower Branch
Jim Shead - Gower Branch History

1836 establishments in England
Birmingham Canal Navigations
Lists of coordinates
Canals in the West Midlands (county)
Canals opened in 1836